This is a list of Belgian television related events from 1996.

Events
9 March - Lisa del Bo is selected to represent Belgium at the 1996 Eurovision Song Contest with her song "Liefde is een kaartspel". She is selected to be the fortieth Belgian Eurovision entry during Eurosong held at the Knokke Casino in Knokke.

Debuts

Television shows

1990s
Samson en Gert (1990–present)
Familie (1991–present)
Wittekerke (1993-2008)
Thuis (1995–present)

Ending this year

Births

Deaths